James Mack may refer to:
 James Mack (curator), curator, director, advisor and arts advocate in New Zealand
 James F. Mack, American diplomat
 J. C. Mack, American soccer player

See also
 Jimmy Mack, a 1967 song